Rita C. Joseph (born July 24, 1970) is an American politician and educator serving as a member of the New York City Council for the 40th district. Elected in November 2021, she assumed office on January 1, 2022.

Early life and education 
Joseph was born in Port-au-Prince, Haiti, and immigrated to New York City as a child. She was raised in Ditmas Park and Flatbush. After graduating from Sarah J. Hale High School, she earned a Bachelor of Science degree in liberal arts from St. Francis College and a Master of Science in education and general studies from Touro University, New York.

Career 
Outside of politics, Joseph worked as a teacher for over 20 years, including at Public School 6 in Brooklyn. She was also appointed to serve as the chair of her local Neighborhood Advisory Board by State Senator Kevin Parker. Joseph was elected to the New York City Council in November 2021 and assumed office on January 1, 2022.

References 

Living people
New York (state) Democrats
New York City Council members
People from Brooklyn
Politicians from Brooklyn
American politicians of Haitian descent
St. Francis College alumni
People from Flatbush, Brooklyn
People from Port-au-Prince
1970 births